Umesh Gopaldev Jadhav is an Indian  politician who is serving as Member of Parliament in the 17th Lok Sabha from Kalaburagi Lok Sabha constituency since 23 May 2019. He was an Indian National Congress party's MLA from Chincholi Assembly Constituency. Later, he resigned from the Congress party in March 2019 and then he joined (BJP) Bharatiya Janata Party and contested Lok Sabha elections from Gulbarga and was elected as a Member of Parliament (Lok Sabha).

Life and education
Jadhav was born to Gopaldev and hails from Gulbarga. He completed his Master of Surgery in General Surgery in 1991 from Bangalore Medical College. He is a doctor by profession.

Positions held 
Member of the Legislative Assembly from  Chincholi : 2013 to 2018
Parliamentary Secretary Health and Family welfare department.
Member of the Legislative Assembly from Chincholi  2018– 2 April 2019
Member Of Parliament 17th Loksabha from Gulbarga Lok Sabha constituency.

References

1950s births
Living people
People from Kalaburagi
Year of birth missing (living people)
Bharatiya Janata Party politicians from Karnataka
Indian National Congress politicians from Karnataka
India MPs 2019–present
Karnataka MLAs 2013–2018
Karnataka MLAs 2018–2023